The Trick to Life is the debut studio album by English indie pop band The Hoosiers. It was released in the United Kingdom on 22 October 2007 by RCA Records. Four singles were released from the album.

Album cover
The album was released with multiple different colours to the front cover. The 2008 Japanese release and the 2017 10th Anniversary re-release has a multi-coloured cover.

Commercial performance
The album reached #1 on the UK Charts.

The album charted at #98 in the UK end of year album chart, selling around 95,900 copies in 2007.

The album has sold 658,056 copies in the UK as of April 2014.

Track listing
All tracks were written by The Hoosiers and produced by Toby Smith (except "Worried About Ray", which is also credited to Alan Gordon and Garry Bonner)

Charts

Weekly charts

Year-end charts

Certifications

References

2007 debut albums
The Hoosiers albums